The Red Lion is a pub in the city centre of York, in England.

The building originated as a house, in a yard off Walmgate.  The original part of the building is to the north-east, built in the 15th century as a house with a first floor hall and other rooms below.  It appears to have been truncated at the north-west end, and is now one-and-a-half bays long.  The south-eastern end of the building was rebuilt around 1600, and an attic was also inserted.  In the 17th century, a lower wing was added to the south-west, in two stages, with a ground floor of brick.  There were further extensions in the 18th century, and a new front was added in the 19th century.

The building is timber framed, but has been largely reconstructed over the years.  The windows are 20th-century.  On the first floor, there is an access between two bedrooms, linked to the chimney, which has been described as a priest hole.  In the front bar is a bread oven, which the pub claims dates from the 13th century, and on these grounds, it claims to be the city's oldest pub.  However, the building only became a pub in the 19th century.

In 1912, the street of Merchantgate was constructed immediately north of the pub, and it is now accessed from that road.  In 1954, the pub was Grade II listed.

A legend claims that Dick Turpin once escaped through a window of the pub.

References

Grade II listed houses
Houses in North Yorkshire
Grade II listed pubs in York
Walmgate